The 2021 Città di Forlì III was a professional tennis tournament played on hard courts. It was the second edition of the tournament which was part of the 2021 ATP Challenger Tour. It took place in Forlì, Italy between 6 and 12 December 2021.

Singles main-draw entrants

Seeds

 1 Rankings as of 29 November 2021.

Other entrants
The following players received wildcards into the singles main draw:
  Matteo Gigante
  Luca Nardi
  Lukáš Rosol

The following players received entry into the singles main draw using protected rankings:
  Filippo Baldi
  Julian Lenz

The following player received entry into the singles main draw as an alternate:
  Valentin Vacherot

The following players received entry from the qualifying draw:
  Daniele Capecchi
  Savriyan Danilov
  Luca Potenza
  Keegan Smith

Champions

Singles

 Pavel Kotov def.  Andrea Arnaboldi 6–4, 6–3.

Doubles

  Alexander Erler /  Lucas Miedler def.  Marco Bortolotti /  Sergio Martos Gornés 6–4, 6–2.

References

Città di Forlì III
Città di Forlì III
December 2021 sports events in Italy